Bank of Montreal v Innovation Credit Union is a decision of the Supreme Court of Canada that deals with the priority of unregistered security interests of a creditor against a security interest created later by a chartered bank under the Bank Act.

Facts
James Buist, a farmer in Saskatchewan, borrowed money from the Innovation Credit Union in October 1991. In return, he provided the credit union with a security interest in all of his present and after-acquired personal property, which would be governed by the Personal Property Security Act (Saskatchewan). The interest was not entered into Saskatchewan's PPSA registry until June 2004.

After this loan was provided, Buist also borrowed money from the Bank of Montreal, and several security agreements were executed between 1998 and January 2004. Buist did not disclose to the bank the loan from the credit union or its security interest, and, as it had not been registered, its existence did not appear in searches of the PPSA and Bank Act registries.

The Bank's security interest was registered under the Bank Act, and the PPSA in Saskatchewan does not allow parallel registration of such interests in its registry.

Buist ultimately became insolvent, and the Bank seized some of his property that was covered by its security in December 2004. The credit union applied to the Court of Queen's Bench for Saskatchewan for a declaration that it had a priority claim over the proceeds of the disposition of that property.

The issue
Was a registered security interest under the Bank Act able to defeat an unregistered security interest that operated under provincial legislation?

The judgments below
The Court of Queen's Bench ruled that the Bank Act had priority by virtue of the Bank having perfected its security interest. As the judge (T.C. Zarzeczny J.) noted,

This ruling was reversed on appeal to the Saskatchewan Court of Appeal. In a unanimous decision (per Jackson, J.A.), the court stated,

Decision of the Supreme Court of Canada

The appellate decision was upheld unanimously by the Supreme Court. While it generally agreed with that decision, the court detailed what it felt to be the correct reasoning in arriving at the result.

The Saskatchewan CA had relied on its previous decision in Royal Bank of Canada v. Agricultural Credit Corp. of Saskatchewan, which had laid down some basic rules for resolving priority issues:

 set aside the PPSA from the analysis and determine the priority as if the PPSA did not exist;
 determine the priority pursuant to [applicable provisions of the Bank Act] to the extent it is possible to do so;
 where appropriate, apply the first-in-time priority rule.

The SCC stated that, while this approach did not lead the Court of Appeal into error in deciding this case, this formulation does not accurately reflect the applicable constitutional principles at play. Step 2 is correct, but Step 1 properly means that internal priority rules of the PPSA have no bearing on determining a priority dispute between Bank Act and PPSA security interests.

However, the PPSA retains importance in resolving the priority dispute at issue:

 As the SCC held in Bank of Montreal v. Hall, the Bank Act security provisions are valid federal legislation which cannot be subject to the operation of provincially enacted priority provisions.
 Thus, where the Bank Act contains an express priority provision that is applicable to a particular priority dispute, that provision will govern.
 In determining what interest the debtor may have already conveyed to another creditor and, in such circumstances, what interest he or she had left to convey to the bank at the time of execution of the Bank Act security agreement, it becomes necessary to resort to the provincial property law, either at common law or under applicable provincial statutes.  It is at this point that resorting to the PPSA becomes relevant.
 It is true that the internal priority rules of the PPSA cannot be invoked to resolve the dispute.  However, it does not follow that the provincial security interest created under the PPSA does not exist outside these priority rules.  Nor can the fundamental changes brought about by the PPSA be ignored in determining the nature of the prior competing interest.  Far from being irrelevant under the Bank Act, provincial property law plays a complementary role in defining the rights granted under the Bank Act.
 A PPSA security interest, just as a Bank Act security interest, is a statutorily created interest and, as such, an interest recognized at law.
 Having a PPSA security interest in collateral does not give a creditor full right and title to the collateral.  Rather, a PPSA security interest gives the secured creditor an interest in the property to the extent of the debtor's obligation.

As noted by the Court:

Significance
This decision has reinforced requirements for banks to practice due diligence in lending to prospective borrowers. They will also need to consider in which cases PPSA registration will be preferable to that under the Bank Act.

In response to this decision, the Parliament of Canada has amended the Bank Act to explicitly state that registry under its provisions will also take priority over unperfected security interests, except where a bank is already aware of their existence. Royal assent was given on 29 March 2012, and the relevant provisions came into force on 24 May 2012.

References

External links

Canadian insolvency case law
Supreme Court of Canada cases
2010 in Canadian case law
Bank of Montreal